Horizon Pipeline is a natural gas pipeline in northern Illinois, United States.  Its FERC code is 178.

The pipeline is owned and operated by Horizon Pipeline Company LLC, a joint venture of the Natural Gas Pipeline Company of America (NGPL), owned by Kinder Morgan Energy Partners, and Nicor. It carries natural gas from the NGPL's interstate natural gas pipeline system Chicago supply hub near Joliet into NGPL's and Nicor Gas distribution systems in northern Illinois near Wisconsin border.
 
The environmental impact assessment of the pipeline was completed in May 2001.  The pipeline became operational on 11 May 2002.

References

External links
Pipeline Electronic Bulletin Board

Natural gas pipelines in the United States
Energy infrastructure in Illinois
Kinder Morgan
Energy infrastructure completed in 2002
2002 establishments in Illinois
Natural gas pipelines in Illinois